St. Mary's College was a Catholic institution established by William Byrne and George Elder in Elder's hometown of Hardin's Creek near Lebanon in Marion County, Kentucky. The community was later renamed "St. Mary" after the college. St. Mary's is now closed. It operated between 1821 and 1976. Before it closed, it was the third oldest operating Catholic college for boys in the nation.

The St. Mary's College Historic District was listed on the National Register of Historic Places in 1980.

Historic district

The "St. Mary's College Historic District" is a  historic district which included 12 contributing buildings.

Notable alumni
Clement S. Hill, U.S. Congressman from Kentucky
Ben Johnson, U.S. Congressman from Kentucky
Elisha Standiford, U.S. Congressman from Kentucky
William Thomas Ward, Union Army General and U.S. Congressman from Kentucky
Joseph Cardinal Bernardin, American Cardinal of the Catholic Church, served as Archbishop of Chicago from 1982 to 1996
Martin John Spalding, Bishop of Louisville (1850–1864) and Archbishop of Baltimore (1864–1872) 
John Lancaster Spalding, the first bishop of the Roman Catholic Diocese of Peoria from 1877 to 1908
Augustus Hill Garland, 11th Governor of Arkansas and Attorney General of the United States
Thomas James Churchill, Confederate major general during the American Civil War and the 13th Governor of the state of Arkansas
Stanislaus P. La Lumiere, President of Marquette University

See also
 List of Jesuit sites

References

The Catholic Encyclopedia. "William Byrne".
Lewis, Alvin Fayette.  History of Higher Education in Kentucky. G.P.O., 1899.
Lmunet.edu "St. Mary's College".
Johnson, E. Polk. A History of Kentucky and Kentuckians: The Leaders and Representative Men in Commerce, Industry, and Modern Activities, pp. 627 ff. Lewis Publishing Company, 1912. Accessed 10 November 2008.

External links
Fordham University

 
1821 establishments in Kentucky
1976 disestablishments in Kentucky
Catholic universities and colleges in Kentucky
Defunct Catholic universities and colleges in the United States
Defunct private universities and colleges in Kentucky
Educational institutions established in 1821
Educational institutions disestablished in 1976
Education in Marion County, Kentucky
Federal architecture in Kentucky
National Register of Historic Places in Marion County, Kentucky
Victorian architecture in Kentucky